Doveyseh or Dow Veyseh or Dow Viseh may refer to:
 Doveyseh, Marivan
 Doveyseh, Sanandaj